Mackenzie Charles Pridham (born August 13, 1990) is a Canadian soccer player.

Career

College & Youth
Mackenzie Pridham played five years of college soccer at California Polytechnic State University between 2009 and 2013, including a red-shirt year in 2010. At Cal Poly, Pridham was selected as the Big West Conference Offensive Player of the Year in 2012 and 2013.

Professional
On January 21, 2014 Pridham was selected in the fourth round (58th overall) of the 2014 MLS SuperDraft by Vancouver Whitecaps FC. However, he wasn't signed by the club.

Pridham signed with NASL club Minnesota United on April 29, 2014. He made his debut on May 12, 2014 in a 0-1 loss to New York Cosmos.

On July 21, 2013, Pridham was loaned to the Pittsburgh Riverhounds of the USL until September 30, 2014.

Pridham signed with Whitecaps FC 2 in the USL on March 17, 2015.

While on trial with Sacramento Republic FC, Pridham scored the only goal for the home side in a friendly 1-2 loss to MLS side, San Jose Earthquakes on February 20, 2016, securing his position with the club, signing a contract three days later. Pridham mirrored his efforts against Highway 99 rivals, Fresno Fuego, proving a productive preseason for the forward.  In order to pursue his soccer career, Pridhim put an entrepreneurial career on hold resulting in taking home much less money.

References

1990 births
Living people
Association football forwards
Cal Poly Mustangs men's soccer players
Canadian expatriate soccer players
Canadian expatriates in the United States
Canadian soccer players
Expatriate soccer players in the United States
Minnesota United FC (2010–2016) players
North American Soccer League players
Pittsburgh Riverhounds SC players
Reno 1868 FC players
Sacramento Republic FC players
Soccer players from Toronto
USL Championship players
Vancouver Whitecaps FC draft picks
Whitecaps FC 2 players